Cacia setulosa is a species of beetle in the family Cerambycidae. It was described by Francis Polkinghorne Pascoe in 1857. It is known from Java.

References

Cacia (beetle)
Beetles described in 1857